Twan is a Dutch masculine given name that is a diminutive form of Antonius, Anton, Antoon, Anthonis, Anthoon, Antonie and Antonis used in Belgium, Netherlands, South Africa, Namibia, Indonesia and Suriname. It is a phonetic spelling of "Toine", short for "Antoine", the French form of Anthony/Antonius. People with the name include:

 Twan Castelijns (born 1989), Dutch cyclist
  (born 1991), Dutch chess grandmaster
 Twan van Gendt (born 1992), Dutch cyclist
 Twan Huys (born 1964), Dutch journalist, television presenter, and author.
 Twan Poels, nickname of Antonius Johannes Petrus Poels, (born 1963), Dutch cyclist
 Twan Russell (born 1974), American football linebacker
  (born 1971), Dutch footballer
 Twan Smits (born 1985), Dutch footballer
 Twan van den Beld (born 2005), Dutch Esports Driver In IRacing

See also 

 TWAN (disambiguation)
 Twan, a character in the 2005 rap opera Trapped in the Closet
 Twan River District, a district of Liberia

References 

Dutch masculine given names